Radio «Shalkar» is a structural unit of Kazakh Radio, which broadcasts only in the state language. It started broadcasting on January 1, 1966. On October 1, 2012 the station moved into a new broadcasting media centre, «QazMedia Ortalygy», in Astana. The station is included in the RTRC JSC «Kazakhstan».

History
Radio «Shalkar» is a structural unit of Kazakh Radio, which broadcasts only in the state language. It has a history of specialised radio for more than 40 years. To date, the station has been broadcasting 18 hours a day.

The basic concept of radio «Shalkar» is the preservation and development of the spiritual heritage of the Kazakh people.

Its thematic focus includes informational, analytical, literary, musical, historical and educational programs.

Since April 2009, radio «Shalkar» has been broadcast in a new format. Programs have become more dynamic and focused primarily on the younger generation of listeners.

Local programming
«Алғыр қазақ»
«Көзайым»
«Дәстүр»
«Елім менің»
«Қазақтың 1000 күйі»
«Терме»
«Төртінші билік»
«Жақсының жары»
«Қазақтың қол өнері»
«Кеш жарық, балақай»
«Әуелетіп ән салса»
«Денсаулық»
«Жұлдызды түн»
«Тал бесіктен жер бесікке дейін»
«Аққулы айдын»
«Жусан исі»
«Кешеден келдік бүгінге»
«Тіл-майдан»
«Заңгер кеңесі»
«Сазды сәлем»
«Наркескен»
«Жайдарман»
«Әлқисса»
«Қайырлы таң, қазақ елі!»
«Дидар-ғайып»
«Қазақ бол!»
«Біздін елдің жігіттері»
«Бақ қараған»
«Ардагерлер»
«Өнер өлкесі»
«Ата-жұрт»
«Атадан калған асыл сөз»
«Ғасыр ғибраттары»

References

External links
Shalkar radio
RTRC JSC «Kazakhstan»

Radio stations in Kazakhstan